Hazi Helo (also romanized as Hazzy Hilo) is the sixth studio album by Najwa Karam.

Track listing
 "Ala Mahlak" (Slowly)
 "Hazi Helo" (I'm Lucky)
 "Ba'adak Ma Btarifni" (You still don't know me)
 "El-Ghorbil" (Filter)
 "Dalouna" (Dalouna)
 "Bta'mil Rai" (You will do a good thing)
 "Qisa Ghareiba" ( A strange story)
 "Khayarouni" (They made me choose)

1996 albums
Najwa Karam albums
Rotana Records albums